The Cornell Big Red represented Cornell University in ECAC women's ice hockey during the 2019–20 NCAA Division I women's ice hockey season. Hosting the 2020 ECAC tournament championship game, the Big Red lost to the visiting Princeton Tigers by a 3-2 mark in overtime. Qualifying for the 2020 NCAA National Collegiate Women's Ice Hockey Tournament, the Big Red were scheduled to face off against the Mercyhurst Lakers in the opening round, but the event was cancelled due to the COVID-19 pandemic.

Offseason

Recruiting

Regular season

Schedule
Source: 

|-
!colspan=12 style="  "| Regular Season
|-

|-
!colspan=12 style="  "| Postseason
|-

Roster

2019-20 Big Red

Awards and honors
Jaime Bourbonnais, 2019-20 CCM Hockey Women's Division I All-American: First Team
Lindsay Browning, 2019-20 CCM Hockey Women's Division I All-American: Second Team
Lindsay Browning, 2019-20 Ivy League Player of the Year
Izzy Daniel, 2019-20 Ivy League Rookie of the Year
Doug Derraugh, 2020 CCM/AHCA Women's National Collegiate Coach of the Year

All-Ivy honorees
First Team All-Ivy
Kristin O'Neill, Cornell
Micah Zandee-Hart, Cornell
Jaime Bourbonnais, Cornell
Lindsay Browning, Cornell
Second Team All-Ivy
Maddie Mills

References

Cornell Big Red women's ice hockey seasons
Cornell
Cornell
Cornell Big Red